WCIL (1020 A.M.) is a radio station  broadcasting a News Talk format as a simulcast of WJPF. Licensed to Carbondale, Illinois, United States, the station serves the Marion-Carbondale area.  The station is currently owned by Max Media.

History
WCIL (AM) signed on the air in 1946 as a daytime-only station with personalities such as Jim Bowen, Bluegrass Roy and others in a second floor studio at about 215 W. Main St. in Carbondale .  At that time, to get the AM license, they were pressured by the FCC to also sign on an FM station.  They kept the FM on the air for about a year and then signed it off the air since, at the time, nobody listened to FM. Later, WCIL moved the studios to a house at a location that is now the parking lot for the First United Methodist Church in Carbondale.  In 1964 WCIL moved again, this time to new studios at 211 W. Main in Carbondale, right across the street from the church.  Paul F. McRoy, the station's owner, foresaw the potential of FM and reapplied for an FM license.  The license was approved and WCIL-FM signed on in 1968 and allowed broadcasting after local sunset when WCIL was required to sign off.  WCIL simulcast programming during this time .  The format was easy listening music and news.  A year or so before CIL-FM was born, Top 40 music was played at night after 10pm.  The FCC required AM/FM simulcasts to split programming.  So, plans were made to split WCIL AM and FM.  The AM and FM split programming and became separate stations on August 16, 1976.  McRoy would go on to sell both WCIL-FM and AM to Dennis Lyle, now the President of the Illinois Broadcasters Association.

Later, in 1997, Lyle sold the stations to the Zimmer Radio Group. Soon after the sale, WCIL became a daytime-only simulcast of News/Talk WJPF.

In 2004, Zimmer Radio Group sold their stations in southern Illinois (including WCIL-FM), along with Cape Girardeau, Poplar Bluff and Sikeston, Missouri to Mississippi River Radio, a subsidiary of Max Media, LLC.

Programming
WCIL is a daytime-only station simulcasting WJPF/1340-Herrin, Illinois.

Ownership
In December 2003, Mississippi River Radio, acting as Max Media LLC (John Trinder, president/COO), reached an agreement to purchase WCIL, WCIL-FM, WJPF, WOOZ-FM, WUEZ, WXLT, KCGQ-FM, KEZS-FM, KGIR, KGKS, KJEZ, KKLR-FM, KLSC, KMAL, KSIM, KWOC, and KZIM from the Zimmer Radio Group (James L. Zimmer, owner). The reported value of this 17 station transaction was $43 million.

References

External links

History of WCIL
http://siualumni.com/s/664/index.aspx?sid=664&gid=1&pgid=15&cid=292&newsid=50

CIL (AM)
News and talk radio stations in the United States
Radio stations established in 1946
1946 establishments in Illinois
Max Media radio stations
CIL (AM)